Windi Manuel Graterol Clemente (born September 10, 1986) is a Venezuelan professional basketball player who currently plays for the Spartans Distrito Capital of the Venezuelan SuperLiga.

Professional career
Graterol won both the 2016 edition of the FIBA Americas League, and the 2016 edition of the FIBA Intercontinental Cup.

National team career
While playing with the senior men's Venezuelan national basketball team, Graterol won the silver medal at the 2012 South American Championship, the gold medal at the 2014 South American Championship, and the gold medal at the 2015 FIBA Americas Championship.

He also represented Venezuela at the men's basketball competition at the 2016 Summer Olympics.

References

External links
Latinbasket.com Profile
FIBA.com Profile
Twitter

1986 births
Living people
Basketball players at the 2016 Summer Olympics
Basketball players at the 2019 Pan American Games
Boca Juniors basketball players
Bucaneros de La Guaira players
Capitanes de Arecibo players
Spartans Distrito Capital players
Centers (basketball)
Cocodrilos de Caracas players
Guaiqueríes de Margarita players
Guaros de Lara (basketball) players
Novo Basquete Brasil players
Olympic basketball players of Venezuela
Power forwards (basketball)
UniCEUB/BRB players
Venezuelan expatriate basketball people in Argentina
Venezuelan expatriate basketball people in Brazil
Venezuelan expatriate basketball people in Puerto Rico
Venezuelan men's basketball players
2019 FIBA Basketball World Cup players
Pan American Games competitors for Venezuela